Bedrettin Yıldızeli  (born 1970) is a Turkish physician. He is a graduate of Marmara University.

See also
List of Turkish physicians

References

1970 births
Living people
Place of birth missing (living people)
Turkish cardiac surgeons
Date of birth missing (living people)